General Sir (Charles) Clement Armitage,  (12 December 1881 – 15 December 1973) was a British Army officer who commanded 1st Division during the 1930s.

Early life
The son of Charles Ingram Armitage, Armitage was born in Honley, West Yorkshire. His family were historically mill-owners who lived at Milnsbridge House, Huddersfield.

Military career
Armitage was commissioned into the Royal Artillery as a second lieutenant on 6 January 1900, as the army expanded due to the ongoing Second Boer War in South Africa, where he was sent. He was promoted to lieutenant on 3 April 1901, while still in South Africa. After the end of this war in June 1902, Armitage was attached to the 74th battalion Royal Field Artillery, which left Durban for British India in October 1902, and was stationed at Lucknow, Bengal Presidency. He later fought in the First World War, serving in France and Belgium. He was appointed Chief Gunnery Instructor at the School of Artillery in 1925, Commandant of the Royal School of Artillery in 1927 and commander of the 7th Infantry Brigade in 1929. He went on to be Commandant of the Staff College, Camberley in 1934, General officer commanding (GOC) of the 1st Infantry Division. The division was sent to Palestine during the 1936–1939 Arab revolt. He was aided throughout this difficult period by his General Staff Officer Grade 1 (GSO1), Thomas Hutton. After handing over command of the division to Major General The Honourable Harold Alexander in early 1938, Armitage was Master General of the Ordnance in India in 1938, in which role he served in the Second World War before retiring in 1942.

He lived at Downington House in Lechlade and served as Deputy Lieutenant for the county of Gloucestershire.

Family
In 1915, he married Hilda Hirst of Meltham Hall, and they had three sons, Charles, Robert and Johnny, and a daughter Mary.

References

Bibliography

External links
Generals of World War II

|-

|-

1881 births
1973 deaths
British Army generals
British Army generals of World War II
British Army personnel of the Second Boer War
British Army personnel of World War I
British military personnel of the 1936–1939 Arab revolt in Palestine
Commandants of the Staff College, Camberley
Companions of the Distinguished Service Order
Companions of the Order of St Michael and St George
Deputy Lieutenants of Gloucestershire
Graduates of the Royal Military Academy, Woolwich
Graduates of the Staff College, Camberley
Knights Commander of the Order of the Bath
People educated at Wellington College, Berkshire
People from Honley
Military personnel from Yorkshire
Royal Artillery officers
British people in colonial India